The Aden Protectorate was a British protectorate in South Arabia which evolved in the hinterland of the port of Aden and in the Hadhramaut following the conquest of Aden by the Bombay Presidency of British India in 1839, and it continued until the 1960s. In 1940 it was divided for administrative purposes into the Western Protectorate and the Eastern Protectorate. Today the territory forms part of the Republic of Yemen.

The rulers of the Aden Protectorate, as generally with the other British protectorates and protected states, remained sovereign: their flags still flew over their government buildings, government was still carried out by them or in their names, and their states maintained a distinct 'international personality' in the eyes of international law, in contrast to states forming part of the British Empire, such as Aden Colony, where the British monarch was the head of state.

History

Informal beginnings
What became known as the Aden Protectorate was initially informal arrangements of protection with nine tribes in the immediate hinterland of the port city of Aden:

 Abdali (Lahej)
 Alawi
 Amiri (Dhala)
 Aqrabi
 Aulaqi
 Fadhli
 Haushabi
 Subeihi
 Yafa

British expansion into the area was designed to secure the important port that was, at the time, governed from British India. From 1874, these protection arrangements existed with the tacit acceptance of the Ottoman Empire that maintained suzerainty over Yemen to the north and the polities became known collectively as the "Nine Tribes" or the "Nine Cantons."

Formal treaties of protection

Beginning with a formal treaty of protection with the Mahra Sultanate of Qishn and Socotra in 1886, Britain embarked on a slow formalisation of protection arrangements that included over 30 major treaties of protection with the last signed only in 1954. These treaties, together with a number of other minor agreements, created the Aden Protectorate that extended well east of Aden to Hadhramaut and included all of the territory that would become South Yemen except for the immediate environs and port of the colonial capital, Aden.

Aden with its harbour was the only area under full British sovereignty and, together with some offshore islands, was known as Aden Settlement (1839–1932), Aden Province (1932–1937), Aden Colony (1937–1963) and finally State of Aden (1963–1967).

In exchange for British protection, the rulers of the constituent territories of the Protectorate agreed not to enter into treaties with or cede territory to any other foreign power.
In 1917, control of Aden Protectorate was transferred from the Government of India, which had inherited the British East India Company's interests in various princely states on the strategically important naval route from Europe to India, to the British Foreign Office. For administrative purposes, the protectorate was informally divided into the Eastern Protectorate (with its own Political Officer, a British advisor, stationed at Mukalla in Qu'aiti from 1937 to ca. 1967) and the Western Protectorate (with its own Political Officer, stationed at Lahej from 1 April 1937 to 1967), for some separation of administration.

In 1928, the British established Aden Command, under Royal Air Force leadership, to preserve the security of the Protectorate.  It was renamed British Forces Aden in 1936 and was later known as British Forces Arabian Peninsula and then Middle East Command (Aden).

Polities
The boundaries between the polities and even their number fluctuated over time. Some such as the Mahra Sultanate barely had any functioning administration.

Not included in the protectorate were Aden Colony and the insular areas of Perim, Kamaran, and Khuriya Muriya that accrued to it.

Eastern Protectorate

The Eastern Protectorate (c. 230,000 km2) came to include the following entities (mostly in Hadhramaut):

 Kathiri
 Mahra
 Qu'aiti
 Wahidi Balhaf
 Wahidi Bir Ali
 Wahidi Haban

Western Protectorate
The Western Protectorate (c. 55,000 km2) included:

 Alawi
 Aqrabi
 Audhali
 Beihan
 Dathina
 Dhala
 Qutaibi Dependence of Dhala
 Fadhli
 Haushabi
 Lahej
 Lower Aulaqi
 Lower Yafa
 Shaib
 Upper Aulaqi Sheikhdom
 Upper Aulaqi Sultanate
 Upper Yafa Sultanate and the five Upper Yafa sheikhdoms of:
 Al-Busi
 Al-Dhubi
 Hadrami
 Maflahi
 Mawsata

Advisory treaties

In 1938, Britain signed an advisory treaty with the Qu'aiti sultan and, throughout the 1940s and 1950s, signed similar treaties with twelve other protectorate states.  The following were the states with advisory treaties:

 Eastern Protectorate States
 Kathiri
 Mahra
 Qu'aiti
 Wahidi Balhaf

 Western Protectorate States
 Audhali
 Beihan
 Dhala
 Haushabi
 Fadhli
 Lahej
 Lower Aulaqi
 Lower Yafa
 Upper Aulaqi Sheikhdom

These agreements allowed for the stationing of a Resident Advisor in the signatory states which gave the British a greater degree of control over their domestic affairs.  This rationalised and stabilised the rulers' status and laws of succession but had the effect of ossifying the leadership and encouraging official corruption.  Aerial bombardment and collective punishment were sometimes used against wayward tribes to enforce the rule of Britain's clients.  British protection came to be seen as an impediment to progress, a view reinforced by the arrival of news of Arab nationalism from the outside world on newly available transistor radios.

Challenges to the status quo

British control was also challenged by King Ahmad bin Yahya of the Mutawakkilite Kingdom of Yemen to the north who did not recognise British suzerainty in South Arabia and had ambitions of creating a unified Greater Yemen.  In the late 1940s and the early 1950s, Yemen was involved in a series of border skirmishes along the disputed Violet Line, a 1914 Anglo-Ottoman demarcation that served to separate Yemen from the Aden Protectorate.

In 1950, Kennedy Trevaskis, the Advisor for the Western Protectorate drew up a plan for the protectorate states to form two federations, corresponding to the two-halves of the protectorate.  Although little progress was made in bringing the plan to fruition, it was considered a provocation by Ahmad bin Yahya. In addition to his role as king, he also served as the imam of the ruling Zaidi branch of Shi'a Islam. He feared that a successful federation in the Shafi'i Sunnite protectorates would serve as a beacon for discontented Shafi'ites who inhabited the coastal regions of Yemen. To counter the threat, Ahmad stepped up Yemeni efforts to undermine British control and, in the mid-1950s, Yemen supported a number of revolts by disgruntled tribes against protectorate states.  The appeal of Yemen was limited initially in the protectorate but a growing intimacy between Yemen and the popular Arab nationalist president of Egypt Gamal Abdel Nasser and the formation of United Arab States increased its attraction.

Federation and the end of the Protectorate
Aden had been of interest to Britain as a link to British India and then, after the loss of most of Britain's colonies from 1945 and the disastrous Suez Crisis in 1956, as a valuable port for accessing crucial Middle Eastern oil. It had also been chosen as the new location for Middle East Command.

Nationalist pressure prodded the threatened rulers of the Aden Protectorate states to revive efforts at forming a federation and, on 11 February 1959, six of them signed an accord forming the Federation of Arab Emirates of the South.  In the next three years, they were joined by nine others and, on 18 January 1963, Aden Colony was merged with the federation creating the new Federation of South Arabia.  At the same time, the (mostly eastern) states that had not joined the federation became the Protectorate of South Arabia, thus ending the existence of the Aden Protectorate.

Aden Emergency

On 10 December 1963, a state of emergency was declared in the former protectorate and the newly created State of Aden.

The Emergency was precipitated in large part by a wave of Arab nationalism spreading to the Arabian Peninsula and stemming largely from the Socialist and pan-Arabist doctrines of the Egyptian leader Gamel Abdel Nasser. The British, French, and Israeli invasion forces that had invaded Egypt following Nasser's nationalisation of the Suez Canal in 1956 had been forced to withdraw following intervention from both the United States and the Soviet Union.

Nasser had only limited success in spreading his pan-Arabist doctrines through the Arab world, with his 1958 attempt to unify Egypt and Syria as the United Arab Republic collapsing in failure only 3 years later. An anti-colonial uprising in Aden in 1963 provided another potential opportunity for his doctrines, though it is not clear whether the revolt among the Arabs in Aden had the Yemeni guerrilla groups drawing inspiration from Nasser's pan-Arabist ideas or acting independently themselves.

By 1963 and in the ensuing years, anti-British guerrilla groups with varying political objectives began to coalesce into two larger, rival organisations: first the Egyptian-supported National Liberation Front (NLF) and then the Front for the Liberation of Occupied South Yemen (FLOSY), who attacked each other as well as the British.

By 1965, the RAF station (RAF Khormaksar) was operating nine squadrons. These included transport units with helicopters and a number of Hawker Hunter ground attack aircraft. They were called in by the army for strikes against positions using "60 lb" high explosive rockets and 30 mm Aden cannon.

The Battle of Crater brought Lt-Col Colin Campbell Mitchell (AKA "Mad Mitch") to prominence. On 20 June 1967 there was a mutiny in the South Arabian Federation Army, which spread to the police. Order was restored by the British, mainly due to the efforts of the 1st Battalion Argyll and Sutherland Highlanders, under the command of Lt-Col Mitchell.

Nevertheless, deadly guerrilla attacks particularly by the NLF soon resumed against British forces, with the British leaving Aden by the end of November 1967, earlier than had been planned by British Prime Minister Harold Wilson and without an agreement on the succeeding governance. The NLF then seized power.

References

Further reading
 Paul Dresch. A History of Modern Yemen.Cambridge, UK: Cambridge University Press, 2000.
 R. J. Gavin. Aden Under British Rule: 1839–1967. London: C. Hurst & Company, 1975.
 Tom Little. South Arabia: Arena of Conflict. London: Pall Mall Press, 1968.

External links

 Official website of the Al-Quaiti Royal Family of Hadhramaut
 Map of Arabia (1905–1923) including the states of Aden Protectorate
 British-Yemeni Society
 Aden Veterans Association
 Historical Flags of Yemen
 WorldStatesmen – Yemen-States of the Aden Protectorates

 
1886 establishments in Asia
1886 establishments in the British Empire
1963 disestablishments in Asia
1963 disestablishments in the British Empire
19th century in Yemen
19th-century establishments in Yemen
20th century in Yemen
Aden in World War II
Aden
Former countries in the Middle East
States and territories disestablished in 1963
States and territories established in 1872
United Kingdom–Yemen relations
Former countries
South Arabia
Former monarchies of Asia
Former British protectorates